Muhsin (also spelled Mohsen, Mohsin, Mehsin,  or Muhsen) is a masculine Arabic given name. The first person known to have the name "Muhsin" was Muhsin bin Ali, the son of Ali ibn Abi Talib and Fatimah bint Muhammad.

Islamic term
In Arabic, it means "the one who beautifies or improves or enriches, particularly one's worship of or relationship with God, or one's actions or conduct toward others" and can mean helper, attractive, beneficent, benefactor, and charitable. It comes from the Arabic language triconsonantal root Ḥ-S-N (meaning "beauty, beautiful, benevolence, benevolent, excellence, excellent"), has two short vowels and a single .

The word Muḥsin is the active participle of either ʾiḥsān "excellence of God's worship" (last of the three stages after ʾislām "submission to God's will" and ʾīmān "faith in God's word") or ʾaḥsān, act of kindness or favor or good will for someone.

Personal name

Notable persons with that name include:

Persons with the given name

Mohsen 
Mohsen Araki (born 1956), Iranian scholar, cleric, university lecturer, and politician
Mohsen Badawi (born 1956), Egyptian businessman
Muhsen Basma (born 1966), Syrian football referee
Muhsen Bilal (born 1944), Syrian politician
Mohsen Dalloul (born 1933), Lebanese journalist and politician
Mohsen Faqihi  (born 1952), Iranian cleric
Mohsen Hamidi (born 1985), Iranian footballer
Mohsen Heidari Alekasir (born 1957), Iranian cleric
Mohsen Kadivar (born 1959), Iranian philosopher
Mohsen Karimi (born 1994), Iranian footballer
Mohsen Kharazi (born 1937), Iranian cleric
Mohsen Koochebaghi Tabrizi (1924–2011), Iranian cleric
Mohsen Makhmalbaf (born 1957), Iranian filmmaker
Mohsen Mehralizadeh (born 1956), former vice president of Iran
Mohsen Mirdamadi (born 1955), Iranian politician
Mohsen Mojtahed Shabestari (1937–2021), Iranian cleric
Mohsen Namjoo (born 1976), Iranian musician
Mohsin Qara'ati (born 1945), Iranian Shia cleric
Mohsen Qomi (born 1960), Iranian cleric and politician
Mohsen Rais (1896–1975), Iranian diplomat and politician
Mohsen Rastani (born 1958), Iranian photographer
Mohsen Rohami (born 1963), Iranian lawyer, Shia cleric and politician
Mohsen Sadr (1871–1962), Iranian politician
Mohsen Shadi (born 1988), Iranian rower
Mohsen Vaziri-Moghaddam (1924–2018), Iranian painter and art professor

Mohsin
Mohsin Ahmad al-Aini (born 1932), Prime Minister of the Yemen Arab Republic five times between 1967 and 1975
Mohsin Ali, Pakistani track and field athlete
Mohsin Bhopali (1932–2007), Pakistani Urdu poet
Mohsin Changezi, (born 1979), Pakistani Urdu poet
Mohsin Dawar, Pakistani politician and leader of the Pashtun Tahafuz Movement
Mohsin Fadzli Samsuri (born 1945), Malaysian politician
Mohsin Hamid (born 1971), Pakistani author
Mohsin Harthi (born 1976), Saudi Arabian footballer
Mohsin Iqbal (born 1983), Indian cricketer
Mohsin Kamal (born 1963), Pakistani cricketer
Mohsin Mighiana (born 1956), Pakistani physician, writer, columnist and humorist
Mohsin Mulla (born 1981), Canadian cricketer
Mohsin Naqvi (1947–1996), Pakistani Urdu poet
Mohsin Razi (born 1955), Pakistani diplomat
Mohsin-ul-Mulk (born 1837), Indian politician

Muhsin
Muhsin ibn Ali, son of Fatimah bint Muhammad and Ali ibn Abi Talib
Muhsin Ertuğral (born 1959), Turkish football coach
Muhsin al-Hakim (1889–1970), Iraqi ayatollah
Muhsin Mahdi (1926–2007), Iraqi-American islamologist and Arabist
Muhsin al-Ramli (born 1967), Iraqi writer
Muhsin Yazıcıoğlu (1954–2009), Turkish politician
Muhsin Hakimzadeh (1882—1967), the 9th Shaykh al-Islam and the chairman of the Religious Council of the Caucasus

Persons with the surname

Mohsen
Marwan Mohsen (born 1989), Egyptian footballer
Monti Mohsen (born 2000), Canadian soccer player
Salah Mohsen (born 1998), Egyptian footballer
Zuheir Mohsen (1936–1979), Palestinian leader

Mohsin
Hani Mohsin (1965–2006), Malaysian celebrity, actor and television host 
Jugnu Mohsin (born 1959), Pakistani publisher and newspaper editor 
Moni Mohsin (born 1963), Pakistani-British writer
Muhammad Mohsin (1732–1812), Indian Bengali philanthropist
Saima Mohsin (born 1977), British journalist

Muhsen
Ghassan Muhsen (born 1945), Iraqi painter
Zana Muhsen (born 1965), British author

Muhsin
Thamir Muhsin  (1938–1995), Iraqi football manager

See also
Daulatpur Mohsin High School, high school located in Daulatpur, Khulna District, in southern Bangladesh
Government Hazi Mohammad Mohshin College, government college in Chittagong, Bangladesh
Hooghly Mohsin College, undergraduate college in Chinsurah, Bardhaman, in West Bengal, India
Kotla Mohsin Khan, 16th century domed tombs and majestic gateway in the old city of Peshawar
Dr Abdulqadir Khan, Pakistani engineer and physicist known as 'Muhsin-i-Pakistan'

References

Arabic-language surnames
Arabic masculine given names
Iranian masculine given names
Turkish masculine given names
Pakistani masculine given names